Niall Diarmid Campbell, 10th and 3rd Duke of Argyll (16 February 1872 – 20 August 1949) was a Scottish peer and historian, the 10th Duke of Argyll and 25th Chief of Clan Campbell.

Background
Campbell was the son of Captain Lord Archibald Campbell, second son of George Campbell, 8th Duke of Argyll, and his wife Janey Sevilla Callander of Craigforth and Ardkinglas, daughter of James Henry Callander and Jane Erskine. His uncle was Lord Colin Campbell and his aunt by marriage was Princess Louise, Duchess of Argyll. He was educated at St George's School, Ascot and went then to Charterhouse School in Surrey.

Campbell studied at Christ Church, Oxford, where he graduated Bachelor of Arts in 1896. He was admitted to the Middle Temple on 1 November 1894 and withdrew without being Called to the Bar in 1917. In 1914, he succeeded his uncle John Campbell, 9th Duke of Argyll in his various hereditary titles and offices.

Career
Following his inheritance, Campbell became Honorary Colonel of the 8th Battalion, Argyll and Sutherland Highlanders until his retirement in 1929. He was additionally Honorary Colonel of the 15th (Canadian) Argyll Light Infantry. Having been previously a Deputy Lieutenant from 1914, He funded the creation of the Inveraray Bell Tower, in memory of the Campbell Clan who died in the First World War.

Campbell was appointed Lord Lieutenant of Argyllshire in 1923, an office he held until his death in 1949. His seat was Inveraray Castle, Argyll and he was interred at Kilmun Parish Church.

Personal life
Referred to as "Scotland's most picturesque Duke", Campbell hated telephones and motor cars and would indulge in eccentric behaviour, including greeting tourists with recitals from Italian operas. He spent his final years in what was called "monastic seclusion".

Fearing that the eccentricity from his maternal relationship could be inherited, he never married and died childless in 1949.

He was succeeded as duke by his first cousin, once removed, Ian Campbell, a grandson of the third son of the 8th Duke.

Ancestry

References

External links

Niall Campbell, 10th Duke of Argyll
Pedigree, geni.com; accessed 21 June 2017.

1872 births
1949 deaths
Alumni of Christ Church, Oxford
10
Lord-Lieutenants of Argyllshire
People educated at Charterhouse School
People educated at St. George's School, Ascot
Deputy Lieutenants of Argyllshire
20th-century Scottish landowners
N